Sergeant Freeman Davis (February 28, 1842 – February 23, 1899) was an American soldier who fought in the American Civil War. Davis received the country's highest award for bravery during combat, the Medal of Honor, for his action during the Battle of Missionary Ridge in Tennessee on 25 November 1863. He was honored with the award on 30 March 1898.

Biography
Davis was born in Newcomerstown, Ohio on 28 February 1842. Son of Charles Davis and Hannah Miller. He enlisted into the 80th Ohio Infantry. He died on 23 February 1899 and his remains are interred at the Oak Hill Cemetery in Missouri.

Medal of Honor citation

See also

List of American Civil War Medal of Honor recipients: A–F

References

1842 births
1899 deaths
People of Ohio in the American Civil War
Union Army officers
United States Army Medal of Honor recipients
American Civil War recipients of the Medal of Honor